Brassington is an English surname. Notable people with the surname include:

Andrew Brassington (born 1954), English cricketer
Christian Brassington (born 1983), English actor
Isaac Brassington (1870–1932), British trade unionist and activist
Pat Brassington (born 1942), Australian artist
Phil Brassington (born 1970), Australian baseball player
Samuel Brassington (1901–1950), Australian politician
William Brassington (1837/1841 – 1905), New Zealand stonemason, sculptor and builder

English-language surnames